The San Francisco Museum of Modern Art (SFMOMA) is a modern and contemporary art museum located in San Francisco, California. A nonprofit organization, SFMOMA holds an internationally recognized collection of modern and contemporary art, and was the first museum on the West Coast devoted solely to 20th-century art. The museum's current collection includes over 33,000 works of painting, sculpture, photography, architecture, design, and media arts, and moving into the 21st century.

Founded in 1935 in the War Memorial Building, the museum opened in its Mario Botta designed home in the SoMa district in 1995. SFMOMA reopened on May 14, 2016, following a major three-year-long expansion project by Snøhetta architects. The expansion more than doubles the museum's gallery spaces and provides almost six times as much public space as the previous building, allowing SFMOMA to showcase an expanded collection along with the Doris and Donald Fisher Collection of contemporary art.

History

SFMOMA was founded in 1935 under director Grace L. McCann Morley as the San Francisco Museum of Art. For its first sixty years, the museum occupied the fourth floor of the War Memorial Veterans Building on Van Ness Avenue in the Civic Center. A gift of 36 artworks from Albert M. Bender, including The Flower Carrier (1935) by Diego Rivera, established the basis of the permanent collection. Bender donated more than 1,100 objects to SFMOMA during his lifetime and endowed the museum's first purchase fund.
The museum began its second year with an exhibition of works by Henri Matisse. In this same year the museum established its photography collection, becoming one of the first museums to recognize photography as a fine art. San Francisco Museum of Modern Arts held its first architecture exhibition, entitled Telesis: Space for Living, in 1940. SFMOMA was obliged to move to a temporary facility on Post Street in March 1945 to make way for the United Nations Conference on International Organization. The museum returned to its original Van Ness location in July, upon the signing of the United Nations Charter. Later that year SFMOMA hosted Jackson Pollock's first solo museum exhibition.

Founding director Grace Morley held film screenings at the museum beginning in 1937, just two years after the institution opened. In 1946 Morley brought in filmmaker Frank Stauffacher to found SFMOMA's influential Art in Cinema film series, which ran for nine years. SFMOMA continued its expansion into new media with the 1951 launch of a biweekly television program entitled Art in Your Life. The series, later renamed Discovery, ran for three years. Morley ended her 23-year tenure as museum director in 1958 and was succeeded by George D. Culler (1958–65) and Gerald Nordland (1966–72). The museum rose to international prominence under director Henry T. Hopkins (1974–86), adding "Modern" to its title in 1975. Since 1967, SFMOMA has honored San Francisco Bay Area artists with its biennial SECA Art Award.

In the 1980s, under Hopkins and his successor John R. Lane (1987–1997), SFMOMA established three new curatorial posts: curator of painting and sculpture, curator of architecture and design, and curator of media arts. The positions of director of education and director of photography were elevated to full curatorial roles. At this time SFMOMA took on an active special exhibitions program, both organizing and hosting traveling exhibitions., including major presentations of the work of Jeff Koons, Sigmar Polke, and Willem de Kooning.

Until the opening of the Museum of Contemporary Art, Los Angeles in 1987 and the modern and contemporary wing of the Los Angeles County Museum of Art, San Francisco's museum tended to function as the state's flagship for modern and contemporary art. In January 1995 the museum opened its current location at 151 Third Street, adjacent to Yerba Buena Gardens in the SOMA district. Mario Botta, a Swiss architect from Canton Ticino, designed the new  facility. Art patron Phyllis Wattis helped the museum acquire key works by Magritte, Mondrian, Andy Warhol, Eva Hesse and Wayne Thiebaud.

SFMOMA made a number of important acquisitions under the direction of David A. Ross (1998–2001), who had been recruited from the Whitney Museum in New York, including works by Ellsworth Kelly, Robert Rauschenberg, René Magritte, and Piet Mondrian, as well as Marcel Duchamp’s iconic Fountain (1917/1964). Those and acquisitions of works by Jasper Johns, Mark Rothko, Francis Bacon, Alexander Calder, Chuck Close and Frank Stella put the institution in the top ranks of American museums of modern art. After three years and $140 million building up the collection, Ross resigned when a slow economy forced the museum to keep a tighter rein on its resources.

Under current director Neal Benezra, who was recruited from the Art Institute of Chicago in 2002, SFMOMA achieved an increase in both visitor numbers and membership while continuing to build its collection. In 2005 the museum announced the promised gift of nearly 800 photographs to the Prentice and Paul Sack Photographic Trust at SFMOMA from the Sacks' private collection. The museum saw record attendance in 2008 with the exhibition Frida Kahlo, which drew more than 400,000 visitors during its three-month run.

In 2009, SFMOMA announced plans for a major expansion to accommodate its growing audiences, programs, and collections and to showcase the Doris and Donald Fisher collection of contemporary art. In 2010—the museum's 75th anniversary year—architecture firm Snøhetta was selected to design the expanded building. SFMOMA broke ground for its expansion in May 2013.

In July 2020 the senior curator of painting and sculpture, Garry Garrels, was forced to resign for using the term "reverse discrimination" during a staff Zoom meeting.

Collections, exhibitions, and programs

Jackson Pollock had his first museum show at SFMOMA, as did Clyfford Still and Arshile Gorky. The museum has in its collection important works by Henri Matisse, Jean Metzinger, Paul Klee, Marcel Duchamp, Andy Warhol, Jackson Pollock, Richard Diebenkorn, Clyfford Still, Dorothea Lange, and Ansel Adams, among others. Annually, the museum hosts more than twenty exhibitions and over three hundred educational programs. While the museum's building was closed for expansion, from summer 2013 through early 2016, SFMOMA presented its exhibitions and programs at off-site locations around the Bay Area as part of SFMOMA On the Go.

In 2009, the museum gained a custodial relationship for the contemporary art collection of Doris and Donald Fisher of Gap Inc. The Fisher Collection includes some 1,100 works from artists such as Alexander Calder, Chuck Close, Willem de Kooning, Richard Diebenkorn, Anselm Kiefer, Ellsworth Kelly, Roy Lichtenstein, Brice Marden, Agnes Martin, Gerhard Richter, Richard Serra, Cy Twombly, and Andy Warhol, among many others. The collection will be on loan to SFMOMA for a period of 100 years.

In February 2011, the museum publicly launched its Collections Campaign, announcing the acquisition of 195 works including paintings from Jackson Pollock, Willem de Kooning, Jasper Johns, Robert Rauschenberg and Francis Bacon. Also under the auspices of the Collections Campaign, promised gifts of 473 photographs were announced in 2012, including 26 works by Diane Arbus and significant gifts of Japanese photography. Works acquired through the Collections Campaign are displayed along with the Fisher Collection in the museum's expanded building, completed in 2016.

SFMOMA's website allows users to browse the museum's permanent collection. The SFMOMA App allows visitors to use their mobile phones to follow guided visit of the museum at their own pace while the App tracks their location.

SFMOMA's Research Library was established in 1935 and contains extensive resources pertaining to modern and contemporary art, including books, periodicals, artists’ files, photographs and media collections.

Selected highlights
Ocean Park #54 by Richard Diebenkorn
The Nest by Louise Bourgeois
The Flower Carrier by Diego Rivera
Frieda and Diego Rivera by Frida Kahlo
Collection (formerly Untitled) by Robert Rauschenberg
1947-S by Clyfford Still
A Set of Six Self-Portraits by Andy Warhol
My Mother Posing for Me, from the series Pictures from Home by Larry Sultan
Untitled, Memphis by William Eggleston
Where There's Smoke Zig Zag chair (Rietveld) by Maarten Baas
Three Screen Ray by Bruce Conner
Video Quartet by Christian Marclay
Intermission by Edward Hopper
Honey-pop  by Tokujin Yoshioka

Architecture

Mario Botta building
Plans to expand the museum at its old site, on upper floors of the Veterans' Memorial Building in San Francisco's Civic Center, were thwarted in the late 1980s. In the summer of 1988, architects Mario Botta, Thomas Beeby and Frank Gehry were announced as finalists in a competition to design the San Francisco Museum of Modern Art's new structure in Downtown. Semifinalists had included Charles Moore and Tadao Ando. The three finalists were to present site-specific design proposals later that year, but the museum canceled its architectural competition after only a month and went with the 45-year-old architect Botta.

The new museum, planned in association with architects Hellmuth, Obata and Kassabaum, was built on a  parking lot on Third Street between Mission and Howard streets. The south-of-Market site, an area near the Moscone Convention Center mainly consisting of parking lots, was targeted through an agreement between the museum, the redevelopment agency and the development firm of Olympia & York. Land was provided by the agency and developer, but the rest of the museum was privately funded. Construction of the new museum began in early 1992, with an opening in 1995, the institution's 60th anniversary.

At the time of the new building's opening, SFMOMA touted itself as the largest new American art museum of the decade and, with its  of exhibition space, the second-largest single structure in the United States devoted to modern art.

The Botta building consists of galleries rising around a central, skylighted atrium, above an iconic staircase. Botta's interior design is marked by alternating bands of polished and flame-finished black granite on the floor, ground-level walls, and column bases; and bands of natural and black-stained wood on the reception desks and coat-check desk.

Rooftop garden
In 2009, SFMOMA opened its  rooftop garden. Following an invitational competition held in 2006, the garden was designed by Jensen Architects in collaboration with Conger Moss Guillard Landscape Architecture. It features two open-air spaces and a glass pavilion that provides views of the museum's sculpture collection as well as the San Francisco skyline. It also serves as a year-round indoor/outdoor gallery.

Snøhetta expansion
In 2009, in response to significant growth in the museum's audiences and collections since the opening of the 1995 building, SFMOMA announced plans to expand. A shortlist released in May 2010 included four architecture firms officially under consideration for the project: Adjaye Associates; Diller Scofidio + Renfro; Foster + Partners; and Snøhetta. In July 2010 the museum selected Norwegian architecture firm Snøhetta to design the expansion.

Opened in May 2016, the approximately  expansion joined the existing building with a new addition spanning from Minna to Howard Streets. The expanded building includes seven levels dedicated to art and public programming, and three floors housing enhanced support space for the museum's operations.

The expansion facades are clad with lightweight panels made of Fibre-Reinforced Plastic; upon completion, this was the largest application of composites technology to architecture in the United States at the time. The building achieved LEED Gold certification, with 15% energy-cost reduction, 30% water-use reduction, and 20% reduction in wastewater generation. The Botta staircase was removed.

Management

Audience engagement
The museum expected attendance to jump from 650,000 a year in 2011 to more than one million visitors annually once the new wing opened.

Board of Trustees
The SFMOMA board is chaired by Robert J. Fisher, its president is Diana Nelson. SFMOMA reserves one seat on its board for a working artist who serves for a three-year period; the special board position comes with no financial obligations to the museum but includes the right to vote and participate in committees.

Funding
By 2010, the San Francisco Museum of Modern Art raised $250 million, allowing it to double the size of its endowment and put $150 million toward its expansion.

Staff

Directors
The current director of SFMOMA is Christopher Bedford, who was appointed in 2022.

Previous directors include:

 1935–1958 Grace Morley
 1958–1965 George D. Culler
 1966–1972 Gerald Nordland
 1974–1986 Henry T. Hopkins
 1987–1997 John R. Lane
 1998–2001 David A. Ross

Curators
 Sandra S. Phillips, Curator Emeritus
 Janet C. Bishop, Curator of Painting and Sculpture
 Rudolf Frieling, Curator of Media Arts
 Clément Chéroux, Senior Curator of Photography
 Corey Keller, Curator of Photography
 Jennifer Dunlop Fletcher, Helen Hilton Raiser Curator of Architecture and Design, Head of the Department of Architecture and Design

Board of Trustees
Source:

Officers
 Robert J. Fisher, Chair
 Diana Nelson, President
 Mimi L. Haas, Vice Chair
 Robin M. Wright, Vice Chair
 David Mahoney, Secretary/Treasurer

Elected Trustees

 Alka Agrawal
 Joachim Bechtle
 Yves Béhar
 Gay-Lynn Blanding
 James W. Breyer
 Carolyn Butcher
 Dolly Chammas
 Adam H. Clammer
 Charles M. Collins
 Lionel Conacher
 Roberta Denning
 Jean Douglas
 Robert L. Emery
 Carla Emil
 Vincent Fecteau
 Irwin Federman
 Doris Fisher
 Patricia W. Fitzpatrick
 Jonathan Gans
 M. Arthur Gensler Jr.
 Linda W. Gruber
 Maryellen C. Herringer
 Adriane Iann
 Bradley James
 Richard M. Kovacevich
 Pamela Kramlich
 Janet W. Lamkin
 Christine E. Lamond
 Gretchen C. Leach
 David Mahoney
 Marissa Mayer
 Nion McEvoy
 Kenneth P. McNeely
 Christopher Meany
 Lisa S. Miller
 Wes Mitchell
 Deborah Novack
 Katie Paige
 Stuart L. Peterson
 Andrew P. Pilara
 Lisa S. Pritzker
 Becca Prowda
 Linnea Conrad Roberts
 Chara Schreyer
 Lydia Shorenstein
 Charlotte Mailliard Shultz
 Norah Sharpe Stone
 Norman C. Stone
 James R. Swartz
 Roselyne Chroman Swig
 Susan Swig
 Barbara T. Vermut
 John Walecka
 Brooks Walker Jr.
 Jeff Wall
 Thomas W. Weisel
 Carlie Wilmans
 Michael W. Wilsey
 Pat Wilson
 Kay Harrigan Woods

Chair Emeritus
 Brooks Walker Jr.

Honorary Trustees
 Gerson Bakar
 Richard L. Greene

Artist Trustees

2006–2009: Robert Bechtle
2009: Larry Sultan. Sultan died in December 2009.
2010–2013: Yves Béhar
2013–2016: Ed Ruscha

Membership

 Gina Peterson (Collectors' Forum), Ex-Officio Trustee
 Katie Paige (Contemporaries)
 Alka Agrawal and Wes Mitchell (Curators' Circle)
 Patricia W. Fitzpatrick (Director's Circle)
 Nathalie Delrue-McGuire (Modern Art Council), Ex-Officio Trustee
 Anna Ewins and Ellin Lake (Museum Guides), Ex-Officio Trustees
 Rebecca Parker and Katherine Thompson (SECA), Ex-Officio Trustees
 Norah Sharpe Stone (SFMOMA Global)

SFMOMA Artists Gallery at Fort Mason
The museum also operates the Artists Gallery at Fort Mason, a nonprofit gallery located at Fort Mason Center in San Francisco's Marina district. The Artists Gallery was founded in 1978 as an outlet for emerging and established Northern California artists. The gallery holds eight exhibitions each year, including solo, group, and thematic shows. Works cover a range of styles and media, from traditional to experimental, and all works are available for rent or purchase.

In 2021, SFMOMA announced they are closing the artist’s gallery along with a publishing platform and the film program.

In Situ
In Situ is a fine-dining restaurant located inside SFMOMA.  It is managed by Corey Lee, the owner-chef of award-winning San Francisco restaurant Benu.  In Situ offers a curated menu that highlights signature dishes from other restaurants around the world.

See also

 America's Favorite Architecture 2007
 49-Mile Scenic Drive
 Donald Fisher
 List of largest art museums
 List of museums in San Francisco
 San Francisco Art Institute

References

External links
 
 SFMOMA Artists Gallery at Fort Mason
 Interactive map of San Francisco Museum of Modern Art
San Francisco Museum of Modern Art within Google Arts & Culture

Art museums and galleries in San Francisco
Modern art museums in the United States
Contemporary art galleries in the United States
Museums of American art
South of Market, San Francisco
Landmarks in San Francisco
Institutions accredited by the American Alliance of Museums
Art museums established in 1935
1935 establishments in California
Art museums established in 1995
Buildings and structures completed in 2016
2016 in San Francisco
Mario Botta buildings
Postmodern architecture in California